The 1937 Philadelphia Phillies season was a season in Major League Baseball. The Phillies finished seventh in the National League with a record of 61 wins and 92 losses.

Offseason 
 January 6, 1937: Chuck Sheerin was released by the Phillies.

Regular season

Season standings

Record vs. opponents

Game log

|- style="background:#bfb"
| 1 || April 19  || @ Bees || 2–1  || Wayne LaMaster (1–0) || Guy Bush (0–1) || None ||  || 1–0
|- style="background:#bfb"
| 2 || April 19  || @ Bees || 1–0 || Bucky Walters (1–0) || Danny MacFayden (0–1) || None || 24,936 || 2–0
|- style="background:#bbb"
| – || April 21 || @ Bees || colspan=6 | Postponed (rain and cold weather); Makeup: July 11 as a traditional double-header
|- style="background:#bbb"
| – || April 22 || @ Bees || colspan=6 | Postponed (rain and wet grounds); Makeup: September 8 as a traditional double-header
|- style="background:#fbb"
| 3 || April 23 || Dodgers || 3–4 || Fred Frankhouse (1–0) || Bucky Walters (1–1) || None || 4,000 || 2–1
|- style="background:#bfb"
| 4 || April 24 || Dodgers || 7–3 || Wayne LaMaster (2–0) || Van Mungo (0–2) || None || 6,000 || 3–1
|- style="background:#fbb"
| 5 || April 25 || Dodgers || 6–10  || Harry Eisenstat (1–0) || Syl Johnson (0–1) || None || 7,000 || 3–2
|- style="background:#bbb"
| – || April 26 || Giants || colspan=6 | Postponed (rain); Makeup: May 29 as a traditional double-header
|- style="background:#bbb"
| – || April 27 || Giants || colspan=6 | Postponed (rain); Makeup: August 22 as a traditional double-header
|- style="background:#bfb"
| 6 || April 28 || Bees || 7–4 || Claude Passeau (1–0) || Danny MacFayden (0–3) || None || 2,000 || 4–2
|- style="background:#fbb"
| 7 || April 29 || Bees || 4–6  || Guy Bush (2–1) || Wayne LaMaster (2–1) || None || 4,000 || 4–3
|- style="background:#fbb"
| 8 || April 30 || Bees || 2–10 || Jim Turner (1–0) || Orville Jorgens (0–1) || None || 4,500 || 4–4
|-

|- style="background:#bfb"
| 9 || May 1 || @ Dodgers || 4–2 || Wayne LaMaster (3–1) || Fred Frankhouse (1–1) || None || 9,602 || 5–4
|- style="background:#fbb"
| 10 || May 2 || @ Dodgers || 1–5 || Van Mungo (2–2) || Claude Passeau (1–1) || None || 15,955 || 5–5
|- style="background:#bfb"
| 11 || May 3 || @ Dodgers || 14–8 || Orville Jorgens (1–1) || Ralph Birkofer (0–2) || Wayne LaMaster (1) || 5,105 || 6–5
|- style="background:#fbb"
| 12 || May 4 || Cubs || 7–14 || Roy Parmelee (2–0) || Hugh Mulcahy (0–1) || None || 3,000 || 6–6
|- style="background:#fbb"
| 13 || May 5 || Cubs || 4–17 || Charlie Root (1–1) || Syl Johnson (0–2) || None || 4,000 || 6–7
|- style="background:#fbb"
| 14 || May 6 || Cubs || 0–1  || Bill Lee (2–3) || Claude Passeau (1–2) || None ||  || 6–8
|- style="background:#fbb"
| 15 || May 7 || Pirates || 3–8 || Joe Bowman (3–0) || Wayne LaMaster (3–2) || None || 4,000 || 6–9
|- style="background:#bbb"
| – || May 8 || Pirates || colspan=6 | Postponed (rain); Makeup: July 18 as a traditional double-header
|- style="background:#fbb"
| 16 || May 9 || Reds || 10–21 || Peaches Davis (1–2) || Hugh Mulcahy (0–2) || None || 7,000 || 6–10
|- style="background:#bfb"
| 17 || May 10 || Reds || 10–3 || Bucky Walters (2–1) || Lee Grissom (1–3) || None || 500 || 7–10
|- style="background:#fbb"
| 18 || May 11 || Reds || 3–12 || Al Hollingsworth (1–0) || Wayne LaMaster (3–3) || None || 1,000 || 7–11
|- style="background:#fbb"
| 19 || May 12 || Cardinals || 3–15 || Bill McGee (1–0) || Claude Passeau (1–3) || None || 2,500 || 7–12
|- style="background:#fbb"
| 20 || May 13 || Cardinals || 4–5 || Lon Warneke (4–1) || Hugh Mulcahy (0–3) || Si Johnson (1) || 1,500 || 7–13
|- style="background:#bbb"
| – || May 14 || @ Giants || colspan=6 | Postponed (rain); Makeup: May 15 as a traditional double-header
|- style="background:#bfb"
| 21 || May 15  || @ Giants || 6–2 || Syl Johnson (1–2) ||  || None ||  || 8–13
|- style="background:#fbb"
| 22 || May 15  || @ Giants || 1–2 || Hal Schumacher (2–4) || Wayne LaMaster (3–4) || None || 22,633 || 8–14
|- style="background:#bfb"
| 23 || May 16 || @ Giants || 6–0 || Claude Passeau (2–3) || Cliff Melton (1–3) || None || 18,950 || 9–14
|- style="background:#fbb"
| 24 || May 18 || @ Pirates || 1–2 || Cy Blanton (4–1) || Hugh Mulcahy (0–4) || None || 2,500 || 9–15
|- style="background:#bfb"
| 25 || May 19 || @ Pirates || 5–4 || Bucky Walters (3–1) || Ed Brandt (3–1) || None || 2,000 || 10–15
|- style="background:#fbb"
| 26 || May 20 || @ Pirates || 2–5 || Bill Swift (3–1) || Wayne LaMaster (3–5) || None || 2,800 || 10–16
|- style="background:#fbb"
| 27 || May 21 || @ Reds || 5–6 || Don Brennan (1–0) || Claude Passeau (2–4) || Lee Grissom (1) || 1,586 || 10–17
|- style="background:#bfb"
| 28 || May 22 || @ Reds || 19–9 || Claude Passeau (3–4) || Al Hollingsworth (1–1) || None || 3,025 || 11–17
|- style="background:#fbb"
| 29 || May 23 || @ Cardinals || 2–6 || Dizzy Dean (6–2) || Bucky Walters (3–2) || None || 13,529 || 11–18
|- style="background:#fbb"
| 30 || May 25 || @ Cubs || 3–5 || Bill Lee (4–4) || Claude Passeau (3–5) || None || 3,093 || 11–19
|- style="background:#bfb"
| 31 || May 26 || @ Cubs || 6–1 || Wayne LaMaster (4–5) || Roy Parmelee (3–4) || None || 3,848 || 12–19
|- style="background:#bfb"
| 32 || May 27 || @ Cubs || 11–2 || Bucky Walters (4–2) || Larry French (0–4) || None || 2,045 || 13–19
|- style="background:#fbb"
| 33 || May 29  || Giants || 4–10 || Cliff Melton (2–3) || Claude Passeau (3–6) || None ||  || 13–20
|- style="background:#fbb"
| 34 || May 29  || Giants || 2–4 || Dick Coffman (1–0) || Hugh Mulcahy (0–5) || None || 12,000 || 13–21
|- style="background:#bfb"
| 35 || May 30 || Giants || 6–3 || Wayne LaMaster (5–5) || Harry Gumbert (1–1) || Orville Jorgens (1) || 8,000 || 14–21
|- style="background:#bfb"
| 36 || May 31  || Bees || 6–3 || Bucky Walters (5–2) || Danny MacFayden (3–6) || None ||  || 15–21
|- style="background:#bfb"
| 37 || May 31  || Bees || 9–6 || Claude Passeau (4–6) || Jim Turner (3–2) || None || 15,000 || 16–21
|-

|- style="background:#fbb"
| 38 || June 2 || Reds || 4–8 ||  || Leon Pettit (0–1) || Lee Grissom (3) || 1,000 || 16–22
|- style="background:#bbb"
| – || June 3 || Reds || colspan=6 | Postponed (rain); Makeup: July 25 as a traditional double-header
|- style="background:#fbb"
| 39 || June 4 || Reds || 8–9 || Al Hollingsworth (2–2) || Wayne LaMaster (5–6) || Peaches Davis (1) || 6,000 || 16–23
|- style="background:#fbb"
| 40 || June 5 || Cardinals || 1–3 || Dizzy Dean (7–4) || Claude Passeau (4–7) || None || 8,000 || 16–24
|- style="background:#fbb"
| 41 || June 6  || Cardinals || 2–7 || Lon Warneke (6–2) || Bucky Walters (5–3) || None ||  || 16–25
|- style="background:#fea"
| 42 || June 6  || Cardinals || 0–0  || None || None || None || 12,000 || 16–26
|- style="background:#fbb"
| 43 || June 8 || Pirates || 1–8 || Russ Bauers (1–1) || Wayne LaMaster (5–7) || None || 2,000 || 16–27
|- style="background:#bfb"
| 44 || June 9 || Pirates || 8–1 || Claude Passeau (5–7) || Jim Tobin (1–1) || None || 1,500 || 17–27
|- style="background:#bfb"
| 45 || June 10 || Pirates || 5–4 || Bucky Walters (6–3) || Bill Swift (4–4) || None || 6,000 || 18–27
|- style="background:#fbb"
| 46 || June 12 || Cubs || 5–10 || Larry French (3–4) || Wayne LaMaster (5–8) || None || 5,000 || 18–28
|- style="background:#fbb"
| 47 || June 13  || Cubs || 8–16 || Clyde Shoun (5–1) || Claude Passeau (5–8) || None ||  || 18–29
|- style="background:#bfb"
| 48 || June 13  || Cubs || 4–3 || Wayne LaMaster (6–8) || Roy Parmelee (5–5) || None || 10,000 || 19–29
|- style="background:#fbb"
| 49 || June 15 || @ Cardinals || 4–13 || Mike Ryba (2–1) || Bucky Walters (6–4) || None || 2,645 || 19–30
|- style="background:#fbb"
| 50 || June 16 || @ Cardinals || 6–7 || Jesse Haines (1–0) || Wayne LaMaster (6–9) || None || 1,801 || 19–31
|- style="background:#bfb"
| 51 || June 17 || @ Cardinals || 13–7 || Hugh Mulcahy (1–5) || Dizzy Dean (9–5) || None || 4,141 || 20–31
|- style="background:#fbb"
| 52 || June 18 || @ Cubs || 7–8 || Clyde Shoun (6–1) || Hugh Mulcahy (1–6) || None || 8,304 || 20–32
|- style="background:#fbb"
| 53 || June 19 || @ Cubs || 1–2 || Larry French (4–4) || Wayne LaMaster (6–10) || None || 11,021 || 20–33
|- style="background:#bfb"
| 54 || June 20 || @ Cubs || 6–5 || Bucky Walters (7–4) || Clay Bryant (5–1) || Syl Johnson (1) || 23,734 || 21–33
|- style="background:#fbb"
| 55 || June 22 || @ Reds || 0–6 || Lee Grissom (6–6) || Claude Passeau (5–9) || None || 2,139 || 21–34
|- style="background:#bfb"
| 56 || June 23 || @ Reds || 3–0 || Hugh Mulcahy (2–6) ||  || None || 4,473 || 22–34
|- style="background:#fbb"
| 57 || June 24 || @ Reds || 4–6 || Paul Derringer (3–5) || Syl Johnson (1–3) || Lee Grissom (5) || 1,151 || 22–35
|- style="background:#bfb"
| 58 || June 25 || @ Pirates || 10–5 || Wayne LaMaster (7–10) || Joe Bowman (6–4) || Orville Jorgens (2) || 5,183 || 23–35
|- style="background:#bfb"
| 59 || June 26 || @ Pirates || 7–6  || Bucky Walters (8–4) || Cy Blanton (8–4) || None || 3,054 || 24–35
|- style="background:#fbb"
| 60 || June 27 || @ Pirates || 3–4 || Red Lucas (5–2) || Claude Passeau (5–10) || None || 3,541 || 24–36
|- style="background:#fbb"
| 61 || June 29 || @ Giants || 3–4  || Al Smith (2–1) || Claude Passeau (5–11) || None || 4,717 || 24–37
|- style="background:#fbb"
| 62 || June 30 || @ Giants || 2–7 || Slick Castleman (8–4) || Wayne LaMaster (7–11) || None || 6,000 || 24–38
|-

|- style="background:#fbb"
| 63 || July 1 || @ Giants || 6–8 || Al Smith (3–1) || Bucky Walters (8–5) || None || 4,808 || 24–39
|- style="background:#fbb"
| 64 || July 2 || Dodgers || 0–3 || Luke Hamlin (5–5) || Hugh Mulcahy (2–7) || None || 3,000 || 24–40
|- style="background:#bfb"
| 65 || July 3 || Dodgers || 7–2 || Claude Passeau (6–11) || Max Butcher (3–4) || None || 2,000 || 25–40
|- style="background:#fbb"
| 66 || July 4  || Bees || 9–14 || Ira Hutchinson (2–4) || Wayne LaMaster (7–12) || Johnny Lanning (1) ||  || 25–41
|- style="background:#fbb"
| 67 || July 4  || Bees || 2–4  || Guy Bush (5–9) || Orville Jorgens (1–2) || None || 10,000 || 25–42
|- style="background:#bfb"
| 68 || July 5  || @ Dodgers || 3–1 || Syl Johnson (2–3) || Waite Hoyt (1–5) || None ||  || 26–42
|- style="background:#fbb"
| 69 || July 5  || @ Dodgers || 1–7 || Fred Frankhouse (5–3) || Hal Kelleher (0–1) || None || 13,319 || 26–43
|- style="background:#bbcaff;"
| – || July 7 ||colspan="7" | 1937 Major League Baseball All-Star Game at Griffith Stadium in Washington, DC
|- style="background:#fbb"
| 70 || July 9 || @ Bees || 0–5 || Jim Turner (8–5) || Claude Passeau (6–12) || None || 1,617 || 26–44
|- style="background:#bfb"
| 71 || July 10 || @ Bees || 4–0 || Bucky Walters (9–5) || Guy Bush (5–10) || None || 2,305 || 27–44
|- style="background:#bfb"
| 72 || July 11  || @ Bees || 10–4 || Hugh Mulcahy (3–7) || Danny MacFayden (4–12) || Wayne LaMaster (2) || 8,500 || 28–44
|- style="background:#fbb"
| 73 || July 11  || @ Bees || 0–1  || Lou Fette (10–3) || Syl Johnson (2–4) || None || 7,158 || 28–45
|- style="background:#bfb"
| 74 || July 12 || Giants || 6–3 || Wayne LaMaster (8–12) || Hal Schumacher (7–8) || Orville Jorgens (3) || 2,500 || 29–45
|- style="background:#fbb"
| 75 || July 13 || Giants || 10–11  || Cliff Melton (9–4) || Hugh Mulcahy (3–8) || None || 2,500 || 29–46
|- style="background:#bbb"
| – || July 14 || Cardinals || colspan=6 | Postponed (rain); Makeup: July 15 as a traditional double-header
|- style="background:#bbb"
| – || July 15  || Cardinals || colspan=6 | Postponed (rain); Makeup: July 16 as a traditional double-header
|- style="background:#bbb"
| – || July 15  || Cardinals || colspan=6 | Postponed (rain); Makeup: August 26 as a traditional double-header
|- style="background:#fbb"
| 76 || July 16  || Cardinals || 3–10 || Si Johnson (3–3) || Bucky Walters (9–6) || None ||  || 29–47
|- style="background:#fbb"
| 77 || July 16  || Cardinals || 10–18  || Si Johnson (4–3) || Bucky Walters (9–7) || None || 8,428 || 29–48
|- style="background:#bfb"
| 78 || July 17 || Pirates || 9–8 || Hugh Mulcahy (4–8) || Mace Brown (3–1) || None || 3,000 || 30–48
|- style="background:#bfb"
| 79 || July 18  || Pirates || 5–2 || Claude Passeau (7–12) || Red Lucas (5–4) || None ||  || 31–48
|- style="background:#fbb"
| 80 || July 18  || Pirates || 5–6  || Bill Swift (7–6) || Hugh Mulcahy (4–9) || None || 8,000 || 31–49
|- style="background:#fbb"
| 81 || July 19 || Pirates || 5–6 || Jim Weaver (2–1) || Bucky Walters (9–8) || Ed Brandt (1) || 1,500 || 31–50
|- style="background:#bbb"
| – || July 20 || Cubs || colspan=6 | Postponed (rain); Makeup: July 21 as a traditional double-header
|- style="background:#fbb"
| 82 || July 21  || Cubs || 1–4 || Bill Lee (10–8) || Syl Johnson (2–5) || None ||  || 31–51
|- style="background:#fbb"
| 83 || July 21  || Cubs || 0–6 || Larry French (6–5) || Orville Jorgens (1–3) || None || 10,000 || 31–52
|- style="background:#bfb"
| 84 || July 22 || Cubs || 7–4 || Wayne LaMaster (9–12) || Clyde Shoun (6–3) || Hugh Mulcahy (1) || 1,500 || 32–52
|- style="background:#fbb"
| 85 || July 23 || Reds || 3–6 || Bill Hallahan (3–5) || Bucky Walters (9–9) || Al Hollingsworth (3) || 5,000 || 32–53
|- style="background:#bfb"
| 86 || July 24 || Reds || 13–11 || Hal Kelleher (1–1) || Paul Derringer (4–8) || Wayne LaMaster (3) || 3,500 || 33–53
|- style="background:#fbb"
| 87 || July 25  || Reds || 3–13 || Al Hollingsworth (7–5) || Syl Johnson (2–6) || None ||  || 33–54
|- style="background:#bfb"
| 88 || July 25  || Reds || 7–3 || Wayne LaMaster (10–12) || Peaches Davis (5–8) || None || 7,000 || 34–54
|- style="background:#fbb"
| 89 || July 27 || @ Pirates || 1–4 || Red Lucas (7–4) || Bucky Walters (9–10) || None || 3,807 || 34–55
|- style="background:#fbb"
| 90 || July 28 || @ Pirates || 4–6 || Jim Weaver (3–1) || Claude Passeau (7–13) || Mace Brown (2) || 1,685 || 34–56
|- style="background:#bfb"
| 91 || July 29 || @ Pirates || 11–7 || Orville Jorgens (2–3) || Bill Swift (7–8) || Syl Johnson (2) || 4,307 || 35–56
|- style="background:#bfb"
| 92 || July 30 || @ Reds || 1–0 || Wayne LaMaster (11–12) || Al Hollingsworth (7–6) || None || 13,168 || 36–56
|- style="background:#bfb"
| 93 || July 31 || @ Reds || 10–8 || Bucky Walters (10–10) || Bill Hallahan (3–6) || Hugh Mulcahy (2) || 1,638 || 37–56
|-

|- style="background:#fbb"
| 94 || August 1  || @ Reds || 1–5 || Lee Grissom (11–10) || Hugh Mulcahy (4–10) || None ||  || 37–57
|- style="background:#bfb"
| 95 || August 1  || @ Reds || 3–2 || Claude Passeau (8–13) || Paul Derringer (4–10) || None || 13,185 || 38–57
|- style="background:#fbb"
| 96 || August 3 || @ Cubs || 1–4 || Bill Lee (12–9) || Syl Johnson (2–7) || None || 9,265 || 38–58
|- style="background:#bfb"
| 97 || August 4 || @ Cubs || 2–1 || Wayne LaMaster (12–12) || Larry French (9–6) || None || 7,852 || 39–58
|- style="background:#bfb"
| 98 || August 5 || @ Cubs || 4–2 || Bucky Walters (11–10) || Clyde Shoun (6–4) || None || 6,531 || 40–58
|- style="background:#fbb"
| 99 || August 6 || @ Cardinals || 7–10 || Mike Ryba (5–2) || Syl Johnson (2–8) || None || 1,784 || 40–59
|- style="background:#fbb"
| 100 || August 7 || @ Cardinals || 4–11 || Si Johnson (7–5) || Hugh Mulcahy (4–11) || None || 3,124 || 40–60
|- style="background:#fbb"
| 101 || August 8  || @ Cardinals || 2–3 || Bob Weiland (8–9) || Claude Passeau (8–14) || None ||  || 40–61
|- style="background:#fffdd0"
| 102 || August 8  || @ Cardinals || 6–6  || None || None || None || 12,475 || 40–61–1
|- style="background:#fbb"
| 103 || August 10 || Dodgers || 3–7 || Roy Henshaw (3–8) || Bucky Walters (11–11) || None || 2,000 || 
|- style="background:#bbb"
| – || August 11 || Dodgers || colspan=6 | Postponed (rain); Makeup: August 12 as a traditional double-header
|- style="background:#bfb"
| 104 || August 12  || Dodgers || 3–2 || Hugh Mulcahy (5–11) || Luke Hamlin (7–9) || None ||  || 41–62–1
|- style="background:#bfb"
| 105 || August 12  || Dodgers || 8–2 || Claude Passeau (9–14) || Max Butcher (5–10) || None || 8,000 || 42–62–1
|- style="background:#fbb"
| 106 || August 13 || @ Giants || 0–5 || Carl Hubbell (16–6) || Wayne LaMaster (12–13) || None || 10,000 || 42–63–1
|- style="background:#fbb"
| 107 || August 14 || @ Giants || 1–4 || Harry Gumbert (5–8) || Syl Johnson (2–9) || None || 10,504 || 42–64–1
|- style="background:#fbb"
| 108 || August 15 || @ Giants || 3–5 || Slick Castleman (11–5) || Bucky Walters (11–12) || None || 15,000 || 42–65–1
|- style="background:#bfb"
| 109 || August 17 || @ Dodgers || 11–1 ||  || Luke Hamlin (7–11) || None || 1,604 || 43–65–1
|- style="background:#bbb"
| – || August 18 || @ Dodgers || colspan=6 | Postponed (wet grounds and rain); Makeup: August 19 as a traditional double-header
|- style="background:#fbb"
| 110 || August 19  || @ Dodgers || 0–3 || Waite Hoyt (4–6) || Hugh Mulcahy (5–12) || None ||  || 43–66–1
|- style="background:#bfb"
| 111 || August 19  || @ Dodgers || 7–5 || Syl Johnson (3–9) || Van Mungo (9–10) || Claude Passeau (1) || 3,760 || 44–66–1
|- style="background:#fbb"
| 112 || August 20 || Giants || 6–13 || Dick Coffman (4–2) || Wayne LaMaster (12–14) || Carl Hubbell (3) || 4,000 || 44–67–1
|- style="background:#bfb"
| 113 || August 21 || Giants || 11–3 || Bucky Walters (12–12) || Cliff Melton (13–7) || None || 3,000 || 45–67–1
|- style="background:#bbb"
| – || August 22  || Giants || colspan=6 | Postponed (rain); Makeup: August 23 as a traditional double-header
|- style="background:#bbb"
| – || August 22  || Giants || colspan=6 | Postponed (rain); Makeup: August 23 as a traditional double-header
|- style="background:#bbb"
| – || August 23  || Giants || colspan=6 | Postponed (rain); Makeup: September 29 as a traditional double-header
|- style="background:#bbb"
| – || August 23  || Giants || colspan=6 | Postponed (rain); Makeup: September 30 as a traditional double-header
|- style="background:#bbb"
| – || August 25 || Reds || colspan=6 | Postponed (rain); Makeup: September 21 as a traditional double-header in Cincinnati
|- style="background:#bfb"
| 114 || August 26  || Cardinals || 8–5 || Hal Kelleher (2–1) || Sheriff Blake (2–4) || Hugh Mulcahy (3) || 5,000 || 46–67–1
|- style="background:#bbb"
| – || August 26  || Cardinals || colspan=6 | Postponed (wet grounds and rain); Makeup: August 27 as a traditional double-header
|- style="background:#bfb"
| 115 || August 27  || Cardinals || 4–1 || Claude Passeau (11–14) || Bob Weiland (11–10) || None ||  || 47–67–1
|- style="background:#bfb"
| 116 || August 27  || Cardinals || 6–3 || Bucky Walters (13–12) || Mike Ryba (6–4) || Wayne LaMaster (4) || 8,000 || 48–67–1
|- style="background:#bfb"
| 117 || August 28 || Cardinals || 9–6 || Orville Jorgens (3–3) || Lon Warneke (15–8) || Syl Johnson (3) || 5,000 || 49–67–1
|- style="background:#bfb"
| 118 ||  || Cubs || 10–3 || Hugh Mulcahy (6–12) || Bill Lee (12–10) || None ||  || 50–67–1
|- style="background:#fbb"
| 119 || August 29  || Cubs || 1–2 || Larry French (11–9) ||  || None || 15,000 || 50–68–1
|- style="background:#bfb"
| 120 || August 31 || Pirates || 3–0 || Bucky Walters (14–12) || Ed Brandt (7–8) || None || 2,500 || 51–68–1
|-

|- style="background:#bfb"
| 121 || September 1 || Pirates || 5–3 ||  || Jim Weaver (6–5) || None || 3,000 || 
|- style="background:#fbb"
| 122 || September 2 || Pirates || 8–11 || Mace Brown (5–2) || Wayne LaMaster (12–16) || Ed Brandt (2) || 3,000 || 52–69–1
|- style="background:#fbb"
| 123 || September 3 || Bees || 2–7  || Jim Turner (16–8) || Hugh Mulcahy (6–13) || None || 7,000 || 52–70–1
|- style="background:#fbb"
| 124 || September 4 || Bees || 6–8 || Ira Hutchinson (4–6) ||  || None || 4,000 || 52–71–1
|- style="background:#fbb"
| 125 || September 5  || Dodgers || 4–6 || Roy Henshaw (4–9) || Bucky Walters (14–13) || None || 2,000 || 52–72–1
|- style="background:#bbb"
| – || September 5  || Dodgers || colspan=6 | Postponed (rain); Makeup: Reverted to original schedule of single games on September 27 and 28
|- style="background:#fbb"
| 126 || September 6  || @ Giants || 2–6 || Cliff Melton (15–9) || Claude Passeau (12–15) || None ||  || 52–73–1
|- style="background:#fbb"
| 127 || September 6  || @ Giants || 3–9 || Hal Schumacher (11–11) || Hugh Mulcahy (6–14) || None || 46,177 || 52–74–1
|- style="background:#bfb"
| 128 || September 8  || @ Bees || 6–3 || Syl Johnson (4–9) || Jim Turner (16–9) || None ||  || 53–74–1
|- style="background:#fbb"
| 129 || September 8  || @ Bees || 0–1 || Milt Shoffner (1–0) || Orville Jorgens (3–4) || None || 3,007 || 53–75–1
|- style="background:#fbb"
| 130 || September 9 || @ Bees || 3–5 || Frank Gabler (3–7) || Claude Passeau (12–16) || None || 1,287 || 53–76–1
|- style="background:#fbb"
| 131 || September 11 || @ Dodgers || 4–12 || Waite Hoyt (7–8) || Hugh Mulcahy (6–15) || None || 1,702 || 53–77–1
|- style="background:#bfb"
| 132 || September 12  || @ Dodgers || 4–3  || Wayne LaMaster (13–17) || Freddie Fitzsimmons (6–7) || None ||  || 54–77–1
|- style="background:#fbb"
| 133 || September 12  || @ Dodgers || 5–9 || Fred Frankhouse (10–8) || Syl Johnson (4–10) || Luke Hamlin (1) || 12,940 || 54–78–1
|- style="background:#fbb"
| 134 || September 14  || @ Cardinals || 8–9  || Howie Krist (1–0) || Hal Kelleher (2–2) || None ||  || 54–79–1
|- style="background:#fbb"
| 135 || September 14  || @ Cardinals || 0–1  || Lon Warneke (18–9) || Hugh Mulcahy (6–16) || None || 4,218 || 54–80–1
|- style="background:#fffdd0"
| 136 || September 15 || @ Cardinals || 6–6  || None || None || None || 1,190 || 54–80–2
|- style="background:#fbb"
| 137 || September 16  || @ Cardinals || 2–6 || Bob Weiland (15–11) || Hugh Mulcahy (6–17) || None ||  || 54–81–2
|- style="background:#fbb"
| 138 || September 16  || @ Cardinals || 1–8 || Howie Krist (2–0) || Hal Kelleher (2–3) || None || 2,391 || 54–82–2
|- style="background:#fbb"
| 139 || September 17 || @ Cubs || 2–10 || Larry French (14–10) || Wayne LaMaster (13–18) || None || 4,218 || 54–83–2
|- style="background:#fbb"
| 140 || September 18 || @ Cubs || 3–9 || Tex Carleton (14–7) || Claude Passeau (12–17) || None || 6,635 || 54–84–2
|- style="background:#bfb"
| 141 ||  || @ Pirates || 8–1 || Hugh Mulcahy (7–17) || Red Lucas (8–10) || None ||  || 55–84–2
|- style="background:#fbb"
| 142 || September 19  || @ Pirates || 1–5 || Russ Bauers (11–6) || Hal Kelleher (2–4) || None || 6,137 || 55–85–2
|- style="background:#fbb"
| 143 || September 21  || @ Reds || 3–6 || Ted Kleinhans (1–1) || Bucky Walters (14–14) || Jake Mooty (1) ||  || 55–86–2
|- style="background:#bfb"
| 144 || September 21  || @ Reds || 10–1 || Wayne LaMaster (14–18) || Joe Cascarella (1–6) || None || 767 || 56–86–2
|- style="background:#bfb"
| 145 || September 22 || @ Reds || 3–2 || Claude Passeau (13–17) || Al Hollingsworth (9–13) || None || 749 || 57–86–2
|- style="background:#bfb"
| 146 || September 23 || @ Reds || 9–5 || Hugh Mulcahy (8–17) || Jake Mooty (0–3) || None || 583 || 58–86–2
|- style="background:#fbb"
| 147 || September 25 || Bees || 1–2 || Lou Fette (18–9) || Bucky Walters (14–15) || None || 3,000 || 58–87–2
|- style="background:#fbb"
| 148 || September 26 || Bees || 3–17 || Milt Shoffner (3–1) || Wayne LaMaster (14–19) || Guy Bush (1) || 4,000 || 58–88–2
|- style="background:#bfb"
| 149 || September 27 || Dodgers || 11–3 || Claude Passeau (14–17) || Roy Henshaw (5–12) || None || 300 || 59–88–2
|- style="background:#bbb"
| – || September 28 || Dodgers || colspan=6 | Canceled (rain); No makeup scheduled
|- style="background:#fbb"
| 150 || September 29  || Giants || 3–6 || Cliff Melton (20–9) || Hugh Mulcahy (8–18) || None ||  || 59–89–2
|- style="background:#bfb"
| 151 || September 29  || Giants || 6–5  || Wayne LaMaster (15–19) || Harry Gumbert (10–11) || Claude Passeau (2) || 5,000 || 60–89–2
|- style="background:#fbb"
| 152 || September 30  || Giants || 1–2 || Carl Hubbell (22–8) || Claude Passeau (14–18) || None ||  || 60–90–2
|- style="background:#bfb"
| 153 || September 30  || Giants || 6–2 || Pete Sivess (1–0) || Al Smith (5–4) || None || 5,000 || 61–90–2
|-

|- style="background:#fbb"
| 154 || October 2 || @ Bees || 1–7 || Jim Turner (20–11) || Bob Allen (0–1) || None || 1,220 || 61–91–2
|- style="background:#fbb"
| 155 || October 3 || @ Bees || 0–6 || Lou Fette (20–10) || Pete Sivess (1–1) || None || 2,829 || 61–92–2
|-

| style="text-align:left;" |
The original schedule indicated single games on June 6 and 7 with St. Louis which became a double-header on June 6.
The second game on June 6, 1937, was forfeited in favor of the St. Louis Cardinals. Contemporary newspaper accounts indicate a 9–0 final score as a result of the forfeiture, but Baseball-Reference indicates a 0–0 score (as the game was not yet official) and Phillies loss. The Phillies manager, Jimmy Wilson, was fined $100 for the stalling tactic.
The original schedule indicated single games on June 11 and 13 with Chicago which became a double-header on June 13.
The original schedule indicated single games on June 1 and July 4 with Boston which became a double-header on July 4.
The original schedule indicated single games on August 1 in Cincinnati and August 24 with Cincinnati which became a double-header on August 1 in Cincinnati.
The original schedule indicated single games on May 24 and August 8 at St. Louis which became a double-header on August 8.
The second game on August 8, 1937, ended after twelve innings due to darkness with the score tied 6–6, and an additional game was scheduled for September 14.
The original schedule indicated single games on August 29 and 30 with Chicago which became a double-header on August 29.
The original schedule indicated single games on September 5, 27, and 28 with Brooklyn. Either the September 27 or the 28 game was changed to a double-header on September 5, but the second game was postponed due to rain. The game schedule reverted to the original plan.
The original schedule indicated single games on September 10 and 12 at Brooklyn which became a double-header on September 12.
The September 15, 1937, game ended after thirteen innings due to darkness with the score tied 6–6, and an additional game was scheduled for September 16.
The original schedule indicated single games on September 19 and 20 at Pittsburgh which became a double-header on September 19.

Roster

Player stats

Batting

Starters by position 
Note: Pos = Position; G = Games played; AB = At bats; H = Hits; Avg. = Batting average; HR = Home runs; RBI = Runs batted in

Other batters 
Note: G = Games played; AB = At bats; H = Hits; Avg. = Batting average; HR = Home runs; RBI = Runs batted in

Pitching

Starting pitchers 
Note: G = Games pitched; IP = Innings pitched; W = Wins; L = Losses; ERA = Earned run average; SO = Strikeouts

Other pitchers 
Note: G = Games pitched; IP = Innings pitched; W = Wins; L = Losses; ERA = Earned run average; SO = Strikeouts

Relief pitchers 
Note: G = Games pitched; W = Wins; L = Losses; SV = Saves; ERA = Earned run average; SO = Strikeouts

Farm system

References

External links
1937 Philadelphia Phillies season at Baseball Reference

Philadelphia Phillies seasons
Philadelphia Phillies season
Philly